Xuemei Bai (白雪梅) is a professor for Urban Environment and Human Ecology at the Australian National University. She was the winner of the 2018 Volvo Environmental Prize, and is an elected fellow of the Academy of the Social Sciences in Australia.

Education and career 
Bai was born and raised in China. She resided in Japan for many years, and is now a citizen in Australia. She earned her bachelor's degree from Peking University (1988), her master's in engineering from The University of Tokyo (1990), and her Ph.D. from The University of Tokyo (1993).

From 1993 until 1998, Bai was a researcher at the Japanese Center for International Studies in Ecology, and then she worked at the Institute for Global Environmental Strategies, Japan until 2006. From 2001 until 2003, she was a visiting professor at the Yale School of Forestry and Environmental Studies.

In 2006 she joined CSIRO in Australia, and in 2011 she became a distinguished professor in the Fenner School of Environment and Society at Australian National University.

Research 
Bai is known for her work in urban sustainability science and policy, including drivers and consequence of urbanization, structure, function, processes, and evolution of urban socio-ecological systems, urban metabolism, urban sustainability experiments and transition, cities and climate change, and urban environmental policy and governance, and cross-scale translations between planetary level boundaries and targets into cities.

Bai's early work studied the urban environment of East Asia and sustainability experiments in Asia. She has also examined the linkages between urbanization and economic growth, human well-being, and the environment. More recently, she has characterized China's urbanization plan, and defined future research plans for sustainable cities.

Selected publications 
As of 2022, Bai has over 16,000 citations to her work at Google Scholar and an h-index of 47.

Awards and honors 
Bai was elected a fellow of Academy of the Social Sciences in Australia in 2017. She was the 2018 Laureate of the Volvo Environment Prize, and was named one of the World's 100 Most Influential People in Climate Change Policy by Apolitical in 2019. In 2021, Bai received the Global Economy Prize from the Kiel Institute for the World Economy.

References

External links 
 

Australian climatologists
University of Tokyo alumni
Peking University alumni
Academic staff of the Australian National University
Living people
Year of birth missing (living people)
Fellows of the Academy of the Social Sciences in Australia